Millennium Eye may refer to:

London Eye, a cantilevered observation wheel on the South Bank of the River Thames
A Millennium Item in the manga series Yu-Gi-Oh!